Mont-Saint-Éloi is a commune in the Pas-de-Calais department in the Hauts-de-France region of France.

Geography

Population

Places of interest
 The church of St. Joseph, dating from the sixteenth century.
 The Commonwealth War Graves Commission cemetery.
 The eighteenth-century chateau d’Écoivres.
 Remains of an abbey church, destroyed in 1783.
 Two menhirs, known as the Twin Stones.

Mont Saint-Éloi Abbey
The monastery was founded in the 7th century by Vindicianus, bishop of Arras and devotee of Saint Eligius. The bishop was buried in the nearby Bois d'Ecoives, but his relics were subsequently removed to the Abbey Church of St. Joseph, which was enlarged in the 11th century. The abbey adopted the Rule of Saint Augustine, and was the motherhouse of St. Botolph's Priory in Colchester. The medieval buildings were demolished in 1750 to make way for a church and convent, necessitated by the aging and shallow foundations of the old abbey.

During the Revolution, the monks left and the abbey was converted into a quarry and pillaged for the stone. What remained of the towers and facade serving as a military observation point during the First World War. In 1915 heavy shelling damaged the towers. It is a protected monument.

See also
Communes of the Pas-de-Calais department

References

External links

 The CWGC cemetery at Écoivres

Montsainteloi